This is a list of notable companies that manufacture Ready To Fly and Almost Ready to Fly airplane kits.

 Airtronics
 Great Planes
 Hangar 9
 Hobbico
 HobbyZone
 ParkZone

Historical RC plane manufacturers

Many notable individuals in the 1960s through the 1990s and beyond created the landscape of modern RC modeling.  These included many starting their own companies.  The families of many of these individuals lost interest in continuing these businesses.  The incoming supply of ARF planes from overseas made it hard to sell kits requiring assembly.

 Carl Goldberg Models
 Name ARF
 Sig Manufacturing

See also

References

External links

Radio-controlled model aircraft kit